Haytham II was the third Shirvanshah after death of his father Muhammad I Shirvanshah. Very little information exists about him too: "Like his father, he fought against infidels in Dagestan, he was ruler of justice and lived a long life "

References